The Jordan River Crossing or Sheikh Hussein Bridge is one of the three international border crossings between Jordan and Israel. It is located between Irbid, Jordan and Beit She'an, Israel.

History
The Sheikh Hussein Bridge was opened in November 1994, and is one of three entry/exit points between Israel and Jordan used by tourists.

The crossing is open for individuals (including tourists and private cars):
Sunday-Thursday: 07:00 AM to 8:30 PM
Friday and Saturday: 8:30 AM to 6:30 PM

Cargo terminal operating hours:
Sunday-Thursday: 07:00 AM to 8:00 PM
Friday and Saturday: cargo terminal is closed.

Entrance to the departure hall with private vehicles for those departing from Israel to Jordan is possible on weekends until 6pm. The terminal operates throughout the year, excluding Yom Kippur and Islamic New Year.

Transportation
There is no public transportation to the terminal, though private buses can cross the border (such as the bus from Nazareth to Amman). A bus service between the two terminals is available every 25 minutes. Rental cars may be left in the parking lot, which has a per day fee.

Between the terminals, one must travel by car or bus. Passing from Israel to Jordan by motorbike or bicycle is forbidden, but passengers are allowed to enter Israel from Jordan with a motorbike.

Privately owned Israeli cars may cross through the Israeli terminal and travel in Jordan after a change of license plates, registration and the payment of a tax at Jordan customs. For drivers entering with a private car, International Driving Permits can be issued at the MEMSI branch at the Israeli terminal.

Visa requirements
To use the Jordan River Crossing, all passports are required to be valid for at least 6 months. Jordanian visa is available on arrival to Israeli citizens, issued at the Jordanian terminal and costs JD10 for travellers who are planning to stay in Jordan for at least 3 nights and JD40 for travellers who are planning on staying there for a shorter period. A fee of JD120 is charged for multiple entry valid six months.

Israeli visa exemption applies to citizens of over 90 countries, who do not require a visa to enter Israel for a maximum stay of 3 months for tourism only. Whereas Jordanian citizens must have an Israeli visa before arrival and confirmation to travel from the Israeli government is most likely required.

Currency exchange
There are no ATMs at Israeli and Jordanian terminals. Exchange is available at the local banks at both the terminals after exit.

References

External links
US Consular Information Sheet - Israel, the West Bank and Gaza

Israel–Jordan border crossings
Toll bridges
Bridges over the Jordan River